The Kawasaki Ha40, also known as the Army Type 2 1,100 hp Liquid Cooled In-line and Ha-60, was a license-built Daimler-Benz DB 601Aa 12-cylinder liquid-cooled inverted-vee aircraft engine. The Imperial Japanese Army Air Service (IJAAS) selected the engine to power its Kawasaki Ki-61 fighter.

Design and development
The Daimler-Benz DB 601Aa was a development of the earlier DB 600, with direct fuel injection replacing the carburetor. Like all DB 601s, it had a 33.9-litre displacement. The first prototype with the direct fuel injection  was test run in 1935, and an order for 150 engines was placed in February 1937.

A manufacturing license was granted to Aichi for the production of this engine for the Imperial Japanese Navy as the Atsuta and to Kawasaki for production of this engine for the IJAAS as the Ha40. Under the 1944 Unified System, this engine was re-designated as the Kawasaki Ha-60.

The Kawasaki Ha40 and the Aichi Atsuta were based on the engine that powered Germany's Messerschmitt Bf 109 fighter.

Ha201
A new high-horsepower narrow-profile engine was required for the Kawasaki Ki-64 experimental fighter. The aircraft design called for a narrow-profile fuselage, and the solution that Kawasaki developed was the Ha-201 engine. Although similar to the Aichi Ha-70, where two Aichi Atsuta engines, mounted side-by-side behind the cockpit driving a single large propeller — an arrangement already used by the Daimler-Benz DB 606 that powered the Heinkel He 119 reconnaissance monoplane prototypes, and later inspired Japan's own Yokosuka R2Y reconnaissance aircraft from the seventh and eighth He 119 prototypes being sold to Japan in May 1940 — for the Japanese Ki-64, its own powerplant installation design called for the two Kawasaki Ha-40 engines to be separately mounted, one in the aircraft's nose, the other behind the cockpit.

The engines were connected to a common gearbox that was mounted in the nose. The rear engine was connected to the nose-mounted gearbox by a long drive shaft similar to the American Bell P-39 Airacobra.  The gearbox did not combine the power output of the two engines.  Instead, the rear engine drove the forward controllable-pitch propeller, while the front engine independently drove the rearward fixed-pitch propeller.

Variants
Ha40 
Up to 1,175 PS (864 kW) at sea level with 2,500 rpm, up to 1,100 PS (809 kW) at 2,400 rpm and  altitude. Used in the Kawasaki Ki-61.
Ha-60 Unified designation for the Ha40
Ha140An up-rated 1,500 hp development of the Ha40 for the high-altitude Kawasaki Ki-61-II KAI interceptor aircraft.
Ha201
Two Ha40 coupled together with a common gearbox, driving a twin three-blade contra-rotating propeller. Used in the Kawasaki Ki-64. The combination was rated at 2,350 PS (1,728 kW) at sea level and 2,500 rpm, up to 2,200 PS (1,618 kW) at 2,400 rpm and 3,700 m altitude.
Ha-72 Unified designation of the Ha201, coupled Ha40

Applications
Ha40
 Kawasaki Ki-61
Ha201
 Kawasaki Ki-64

Specifications (Ha40)

See also

References

Notes

Bibliography
 Monogram Closeup 13.  .
 Francillon, R. J., Japanese Aircraft of the Pacific War, Putnam, London, 1970 SBN 370 00033 1

External links

 Aviation History.com, DB 600 series page
 Kurfürst - Resource on Messerschmitt Bf 109 performance.

1930s aircraft piston engines
Inverted aircraft piston engines